Edgecumbe is a town in the Bay of Plenty Region of the North Island of New Zealand,  to the west of Whakatāne and  south of the Bay's coast.

It is the main service town for the agricultural region surrounding the plains of the Rangitaiki River, which flows through the town.

State Highway 2 and the Tāneatua Branch railway line (disused) pass through the town.

The Edgecumbe Dairy Factory, established in 1915, employs 358 people, roughly a fifth of Edgecumbe's total population.

History
The town is named after the small village of Edgecumbe in Cornwall, United Kingdom, between Penryn and Helston. Edgecumbe was linked with Tauranga and Auckland by rail, with the opening of the East Coast Main Trunk Railway and Taneatua Express in 1928.

In 1987, a large earthquake centered on Edgecumbe shook the Bay of Plenty, causing widespread damage and causing much of the population to leave Edgecumbe.

In July 2004,  May 2005 and April 2017, the town experienced heavy flooding that ruined many homes. In the 2005 flood, the river swelled to within 5 cm of breaching the flood banks that had been put in place seven years prior.

1987 Edgecumbe earthquake

The earthquake was a major turning point in the history of Edgecumbe. It measured 6.3 on the Richter magnitude scale and struck the Bay of Plenty region of New Zealand on 2 March 1987, just after 1.42 pm. The earthquake was very shallow, being centred approximately 8 km from the Earth's surface. The earthquake was one of the most damaging New Zealand's North Island has experienced in recent decades, with approximately 50% of the houses in Edgecumbe being damaged by the quake. There was extensive damage to a local milk factory, with large storage tanks toppled. Kawerau was another nearby town that suffered damage and Whakatane was also badly shaken. An 80-tonne New Zealand Railways DC class locomotive was thrown onto its side.

The earthquake caused no fatalities.

However, one person died at the time as a result of a heart attack, possibly due to the quake. A foreshock just minutes before had cut the power supply and many people had moved away from heavy machinery and out of their houses. The largest aftershock was measured at 5.2 and struck at 1.52 pm.

It is now known as the 'Edgecumbe Fault'. At one point, the land close to the fault dropped .

The intense ground-shaking caused by the earthquake led to a large number of ground surface failures, including sand boils, ridge-top shatters and debris avalanches on steeper slopes. Because of the earthquake, many people left and therefore Edgecumbe's population dropped considerably. Edgecumbe is slowly recovering as it has increased by 21 in the years 2006 to 2013, possibly due to many kiwifruit orchards being affected by PSA.

2017 Edgecumbe flood

In April 2017, remnants of Cyclone Debbie caused heavy rainfall in the region. At 8:30 am on April 6, water from the Rangitaiki River breached a stopbank next to Edgecumbe, causing widespread flooding across the township. A state of emergency was declared for the Whakatane District, and around 2000 people were evacuated to Kawerau and Whakatane. More than 300 homes were damaged, with some becoming uninhabitable. 

There were no deaths due to the flood, yet, over 50 percent of people there were highly effected by it.

The largest animal rescue in New Zealand history was recorded during the aftermath of the flood. Approximately 1000 animals were rescued by an SPCA led operation, with support from local civil defence rescue teams and veterinarians from Massey University. The event highlighted a significant gap in animal welfare emergency management capability in New Zealand.

Demographics

Edgecumbe had a population of 1,644 at the 2018 New Zealand census, an increase of 6 people (0.4%) since the 2013 census, and an increase of 18 people (1.1%) since the 2006 census. There were 546 households, comprising 855 males and 786 females, giving a sex ratio of 1.09 males per female. The median age was 34.5 years (compared with 37.4 years nationally), with 402 people (24.5%) aged under 15 years, 330 (20.1%) aged 15 to 29, 654 (39.8%) aged 30 to 64, and 255 (15.5%) aged 65 or older.

Ethnicities were 66.6% European/Pākehā, 46.4% Māori, 3.3% Pacific peoples, 4.7% Asian, and 2.0% other ethnicities. People may identify with more than one ethnicity.

The percentage of people born overseas was 9.3, compared with 27.1% nationally.

Although some people chose not to answer the census's question about religious affiliation, 56.2% had no religion, 28.5% were Christian, 4.6% had Māori religious beliefs, 0.5% were Hindu, 0.2% were Muslim, 0.2% were Buddhist and 2.9% had other religions.

Of those at least 15 years old, 126 (10.1%) people had a bachelor's or higher degree, and 318 (25.6%) people had no formal qualifications. The median income was $25,200, compared with $31,800 nationally. 144 people (11.6%) earned over $70,000 compared to 17.2% nationally. The employment status of those at least 15 was that 618 (49.8%) people were employed full-time, 165 (13.3%) were part-time, and 66 (5.3%) were unemployed.

Geography
Edgecumbe is located inland from the coast on the end of the fertile Rangitaiki Plains. The nearby beach is part of Maketu. The volcanic cone of Mount Edgecumbe, 15 kilometres to the south and close to the town of Kawerau, is visible from Edgecumbe.

Clubs and organisations
The Association Football Club Plains Rangers AFC is based at the Edgecumbe Domain, along with rugby and hockey.

The Edgecumbe Volunteer Fire Brigade is located on SH2 and services the township and surrounding area.

The town has a local rugby club, and a Kart Sport track.

Education

Notable people
 Eve Rimmer, paraplegic athlete

References

Whakatane District
Populated places in the Bay of Plenty Region